The 1930 Minnesota gubernatorial election took place on November 4, 1930.  It was the first gubernatorial race to start in Minnesota since the beginning of the Great Depression, which contributed to the meteoric rise of the Farmer–Labor Party in the state. Farmer–Labor Party candidate Floyd B. Olson decisively defeated Republican Party of Minnesota challenger Raymond P. Chase. Joseph A. A. Burnquist unsuccessfully ran for the Republican nomination.

Results

See also
 List of Minnesota gubernatorial elections

External links
 http://www.sos.state.mn.us/home/index.asp?page=653
 http://www.sos.state.mn.us/home/index.asp?page=657

Minnesota
Gubernatorial
1930
November 1930 events